Cape Coast Castle is one of about forty "slave castles", or large commercial forts, built on the Gold Coast of West Africa (now Ghana) by European traders. It was originally a Portuguese "feitoria" or trading post, established in 1555, which they named Cabo Corso. However, in 1653 the Swedish Africa Company constructed a timber fort there. It originally  was a centre for the trade in timber and gold. It was later used in the Atlantic slave trade. Other Ghanaian slave castles include Elmina Castle and Fort Christiansborg. They were used to hold enslaved Africans before they were loaded onto ships and sold in the Americas, especially the Caribbean. This "gate of no return" was the last stop before crossing the Atlantic Ocean. Cape Coast Castle, along with other forts and castles in Ghana, are included on the UNESCO World Heritage List because of their testimony to the Atlantic gold and slave trades.

Trade history
The large quantity of gold dust found in Ghana was what primarily attracted Europe, and many natives of Cape Coast used this to their advantage. In exchange for gold, mahogany, other locally produced goods, and enslaved captives, local Africans received clothing, blankets, spices, sugar, silk and many other items. The castle at Cape Coast was a market where these transactions took place.

At the time enslaved Africans were a valuable commodity in the Americas and elsewhere, and slaves were the main trade in Cape Coast. Due to this, many changes were made to Cape Coast Castle. One of the alterations was the addition of large underground dungeons that could hold as many as a thousand slaves awaiting export. Many European nations flocked to Cape Coast in order to get a foothold in the slave trade. The business was very competitive, which led to conflict and for this reason, the castle at Cape Coast changed hands many times during the course of its commercial history.

Living conditions 
In Cape Coast Castle, the underground dungeon was a space of terror, death, and darkness. This stood as a direct juxtaposition to the European living quarters and commanding heights of the administrative quarters above, who lived relatively luxuriously. The basement of this imposing fortress was often the last memory slaves had of their homeland before being shipped off across the Atlantic, as this signified the beginning of their journey.

Building history
The first fort established on the present site of Cape Coast Castle was built by Hendrik Caerloff for the Swedish Africa Company. Caerloff was a former employee of the Dutch West India Company who had risen to the rank of fiscal before employing himself with the latter company established by Louis de Geer. As a former high-ranking officer of the Dutch, Caerloff had the friendly relations with the local chiefs necessary to establish a trading post. In 1650, Caerloff succeeded in getting the permission of the king of Fetu to establish a fort at Cabo Corso (meaning "short cape" in Portuguese, later corrupted to English Cape Coast).  The first timber lodge was erected at the site in 1653 and named Carolusborg after King Charles X of Sweden.

Karloff returned to Europe in 1655, leaving Johann Philipp von Krusenstjerna in charge of Carolusborg. Louis de Geer had, however, died in the meantime, and Caerloff got himself involved in a serious dispute with his heirs. In Amsterdam, he convinced merchants to give a financial injection to the Danish West India Company, for which he set sail to the Gold Coast in 1657, with the goal in mind to capture for Denmark the Swedish lodges and forts he had established himself. With the help of the Dutch, Caerloff succeeded in driving the Swedes out, leaving the Gold Coast on the captured ship Stockholms Slott, and with Von Krusenstjerna on board as a prisoner.

Karloff had left Samuel Smit, also a former employee of the Dutch West India Company, in charge of Carolusborg. The Dutch were able to convince Smit in 1659 of the rumor that Denmark had been conquered by Sweden, upon which Smit rejoined the Dutch West India Company, handing over all Danish possessions to the Dutch. The King of Fetu was displeased with this, however, and prevented the Dutch from taking possession of the fort. A year later, the King decided to sell it to the Swedes. After the King died in 1663, the Dutch were finally able to occupy the fort.

The Danes had in the meantime established another fort, Fort Frederiksborg (1661), just a few hundred meters east from Carolusborg. Although situated perfectly to launch an attack on Carolusborg, the English capture of Carolusborg (1664) during the prelude to the Second Anglo-Dutch War, prevented the Danes from challenging them; the English had reinforced the fort, which they named Cape Coast Castle, to such an extent that even Dutch Admiral Michiel de Ruyter deemed it impossible to conquer. As the Dutch had captured the former English headquarters at Kormantin and had rebuilt it as Fort Amsterdam, Cape Coast became the new capital of the English possessions on the Gold Coast.

In 1689, the pirate Duncan Mackintosh was hanged at the Castle with a few of his crew, though he would not be the last pirate hanged at the fort. In 1722, the fort was the site where 54 men of the crew of the pirate Bartholomew Roberts were condemned to death, of whom 52 were hanged and two reprieved. 

In 1757, during the Seven Years' War, a French naval squadron badly damaged and nearly captured Cape Coast Castle. This event was likely one of the most important reasons to entirely reconstruct the Castle, which was quite notorious for its collapsing walls and leaking roofs. In 1762, an extensive spur ending in a tower was built on the western side and in 1773, a high building along the north curtain was erected, during which the last remnants of the 17th-century fort were demolished. Greenhill Point, a bastion to the east of the castle, was replaced by two new bastions, with a sea gate in the middle. To the south, two new bastions, named Grassle's Bastions, replaced an old round tower as the main defensive work. The tower, which now had no military use, was extended in the 1790s with two stories, now becoming the governors' apartments. The space below Grassle's Bastions was used as the new slave dungeons.

Notable governors

In 1824, British Governor Sir Charles MacCarthy, was defeated by the Ashanti army, committed suicide, and his skull was taken back to the Ashanti capital Kumasi where it was reportedly used as a drinking cup. George Maclean was President of the Committee of Merchants at Cape Coast Castle from 1830 until 1844, a period when a President rather than a Governor ruled the British in the Gold Coast. In October 1836 he met the poet Letitia Landon at a dinner party while on a visit to the UK. They married and traveled back to Cape Coast Castle where, within two months, Landon died of heart failure. Both Maclean and Landon are buried in the castle courtyard. Maclean was charged with putting an end to slave trading and did so along  of the West African coast. However his reputation was muddied by his willingness to support the ownership of slaves within the vicinity of Cape Coast Castle. As such he was demoted to Judicial Assessor and maintained for his extensive local knowledge and commitment to trade. He also made peace with the Ashanti (Treaty of 1831), instituted a judicial system still in use in many African democracies, and encouraged successful and fair trading.  From 1846–1850, Governor William Winniett was also active in ending the slave trade. He died in the Fortress.

Restoration

The castle, or castle and dungeon, to give it its official name, was first restored in the 1920s by the British Public Works Department.

In 1957, when Ghana became independent, the castle came under the care of the Ghana Museums and Monuments Board (GMMB). In the early 1990s the building was restored by the Ghanaian Government, with funds from the United Nations Development Programme (UNDP), United States Agency for International Development (USAID), with technical assistance from the Smithsonian Institution and other NGOs.

Cultural references 
The 2016 novel Homegoing by Yaa Gyasi makes frequent references to the Castle. The contrast in living conditions between the Europeans living above and the slaves living below are highlighted in the individual stories of two half-sisters, Effia and Esi, during their time at the castle. While Effia, the wife of an English slaver, lives in luxury, Esi suffers in the squalid living conditions in the dungeons below unbeknownst to her half-sister.

3D documentation with terrestrial laser scanning 
In 2015, the Zamani Project documented Cape Coast Castle with terrestrial 3D laser scanning. The non-profit research group specialises in 3D digital documentation of tangible cultural heritage. The data generated by the Zamani Project creates a permanent record that can be used for research, education, restoration, and conservation. A 3D model and a panorama tour of Cape Coast Castle are available on www.zamaniproject.org. An animation of the 3D model is available here.

Gallery

See also
 Town of Cape Coast, Ghana
 Cape Coast Castle Museum, Cape Coast, Ghana
 List of castles in Ghana

References

Sources
Osei-Tutu, Brepong (2004), "African American reactions to the restoration of Ghana's 'slave castles' ", in: Public Archaeology; 3/4, 2004, pp. 195–204. .
Shumway, Rebecca (2011), The Fante and the Transatlantic Slave Trade. Rochester: University of Rochester Press. .
St. Clair, William (2006), The Grand Slave Emporium: Cape Coast Castle and the British slave trade. London: Profile Books .
 
WorldStatesmen - Ghana

External links

Cape Coast Castle Museum
Cape Coast Slave Castle
Cape Coast Castle
British Slave Castle, Cape Coast Photo Gallery (12 July 2005)

Castles in Ghana
Cape Coast
Forts in Ghana
Gold Coast (British colony)
African slave trade
Swedish colonisation in Africa
1653 establishments in Africa
1653 establishments in the Swedish colonial empire
17th century in Ghana
Ghana–Sweden relations
World Heritage Sites in Ghana
Slavery museums